Rotational frequency (also known as rotational speed or rate of rotation) of an object rotating around an axis is the frequency of rotation of the object.  Its unit is revolution per minute (rpm), cycle per second (cps), etc.

Tangential speed v, rotational frequency , and radial distance r, are related by the following equation:

An algebraic rearrangement of this equation allows us to solve for rotational frequency:

Thus, the tangential speed will be directly proportional to r when all parts of a system simultaneously have the same ω, as for a wheel, disk, or rigid wand. The direct proportionality of v to r is not valid for the planets, because the planets have different rotational frequencies.

Rotational frequency can measure, for example, how fast a motor is running. Rotational speed is sometimes used to mean angular frequency rather than the quantity defined in this article. Angular frequency gives the change in angle per time unit, which is given with the unit radian per second in the SI system. Since 2π radians or 360 degrees correspond to a cycle, we can convert angular frequency to rotational frequency by

where
  is rotational frequency, with unit cycles per second
  is angular frequency, with unit radian per second or degree per second

For example, a stepper motor might turn exactly one complete revolution each second.
Its angular frequency is 360 degrees per second (360°/s), or 2π radians per second (2π rad/s), while the rotational frequency is 60 rpm.

Rotational frequency is not to be confused with tangential speed, despite some relation between the two concepts. Imagine a merry-go-round with a constant rate of rotation.  No matter how close or far you stand from the axis of rotation, your rotational frequency will remain constant. However, your tangential speed does not remain constant.  If you stand two meters from the axis of rotation, your tangential speed will be double the amount if you were standing only one meter from the axis of rotation.

See also
Angular velocity
Radial velocity
Rotation period

References

Kinematic properties
Temporal rates